The Race of the Tiger is an historical novel by the Welsh writer Alexander Cordell (1914–1997) set in mid-19th century Pittsburgh, Pennsylvania.

It is a family saga of the O'Haras of Connemara, Ireland, who flee the English yoke to make their fortune in the New World, where iron barons such as Andrew Carnegie and Henry Clay Frick thrive in an era of unprecedented industrial growth. Labor agitation, violence, and the Molly Maguire movement erupt in Pittsburgh's steel industry when the new Bessemer process throws many Irish immigrants out of work in the 1870s.

References

1963 British novels
Novels set in Pittsburgh
Doubleday (publisher) books
Family saga novels
Victor Gollancz Ltd books
Novels by Alexander Cordell